Leon Harris (born 9 November 1958) is a former Australian rules footballer who played with Fitzroy in the VFL during the 1980s. 

Harris played as a rover and finished runner up in Fitzroy's 1987 best and fairest awards. He was the first player in the history of the league to kick 100 goals with the number 38 guernsey. Harris represented Victoria at the 1988 Bicentennial Carnival and after retiring as a player served as a Fitzroy assistant coach.

Leon's brother Bernie Harris played with Fitzroy, the Brisbane Bears and St Kilda in the Victorian/Australian Football League (VFL/AFL).

External links

Brief profile of Leon Harris

1958 births
Living people
Australian rules footballers from Victoria (Australia)
Fitzroy Football Club players
Werribee Football Club coaches
Werribee Football Club players
Mortlake Football Club players
Victorian State of Origin players